Great Britain, represented by the British Olympic Association (BOA), competed at the 2000 Summer Olympics in Sydney, Australia. British athletes have competed in every Summer Olympic Games. 310 competitors, 181 men and 129 women, took part in 179 events in 23 sports. These were the first Summer Olympics in which the team of selected athletes was officially known as Team GB in a highly successful attempt to unify all the competing athletes across all the sports and events and boost team morale. Going into the games following their exceptionally poor performance in Atlanta widespread expectations of the team were low.

The Sydney Games was at the time the best performance by Great Britain in the Summer Olympic Games since 1920, with British competitors winning a total of 28 medals, 11 of which were gold. This represented a vast improvement in performance over the previous Summer Olympics in 1996, in which Great Britain won only one gold medal and 15 in total, and was the first of five consecutive Summer Olympics in which Great Britain would not only dramatically increase its overall performance and expectations but also see them dramatically increase its overall Summer Olympics medal tally. This was also the first Summer Olympic Games where British competitors benefited from £58.9m of National Lottery funding when it was introduced in 1997.

Medallists

|  style="text-align:left; width:78%; vertical-align:top;"|

|  style="text-align:left; width:22%; vertical-align:top;"|

Multiple medallists
The following Team GB competitors won multiple medals at the 2000 Olympic Games.

Archery

The three British archers had a combined record of 3-3.

Athletics

Men
Track & road events

Field events

Combined events – Decathlon

Women
Track & road events

Field events

Combined events – Heptathlon

Badminton

Men

Women

Mixed

Boxing

Canoeing

Slalom

Sprint

Cycling

Road

Men

Women

Track

Sprint

Pursuit

Qualification legend: FA=Gold medal final; FB=Bronze medal final

Keirin

Time trial

Omnium

Mountain biking

Diving

Men

Women

Equestrian

Fencing

Three fencers, two men and one woman, represented Great Britain in 2000.

Gymnastics

Lisa Mason, Annika Reeder, Emma Williams, Sharna Murray, Kelly Hackman & Paula Thomas represented Great Britain. The Team placed 10th which was the highest placing attained by GBR Women's Artistic Gymnastics at an Olympic Games.

Artistic
Men

Women
Team

Individual finals

Trampoline

Field hockey

Men's tournament

Squad

Head coach: Barry Dancer

Simon Mason (GK)
David Luckes (GK)
Jon Wyatt (c)
Julian Halls
Tom Bertram
Craig Parnham
Guy Fordham
Ben Sharpe
Mark Pearn
Jimmy Wallis
Brett Garrard
Bill Waugh
Daniel Hall
Michael Johnson
Calum Giles
David Hacker

Group stage

5th–8th classification

Crossover

5th–6th place final

Women's tournament

Squad

Head coach: Chris Spice

Carolyn Reid (GK)
Hilary Rose (GK)
Kirsty Bowden
Jane Smith
Melanie Clewlow
Christina Cullen
Kath Johnson
Lucilla Wright
Jane Sixsmith
Rhona Simpson
Denise Marston-Smith
Helen Richardson
Fiona Greenham
Pauline Stott (c)
Kate Walsh
Mandy Nicholson

Group stage

7th–10th classification

Crossover

7th–8th place final

Judo

Men

Women

Modern pentathlon

Rowing

Men

Women

Qualification Legend: FA=Final A (medal); FB=Final B (non-medal); FC=Final C (non-medal); FD=Final D (non-medal); FE=Final E (non-medal); FF=Final F (non-medal); SA/B=Semifinals A/B; SC/D=Semifinals C/D; SE/F=Semifinals E/F; R=Repechage

Sailing

Great Britain competed in ten of the eleven Sailing events at the Sydney Olympics. They won three gold medals and two silver medals.

Men

Women

Open
Fleet racing

Match racing

Shooting

Swimming

Men

Qualifiers for the latter rounds (Q) of all events were decided on a time only basis, therefore positions shown are overall results versus competitors in all heats.
* Competed in the heats only

Women

Qualifiers for the latter rounds (Q) of all events were decided on a time only basis, therefore positions shown are overall results versus competitors in all heats.

Table tennis

Taekwondo

Tennis

Men

Women

Triathlon

The three British triathletes that finished the inaugural Olympic triathlon placed highly, with none lower than fifteenth place and two in the top ten. However, three more British athletes did not finish the competition.

Weightlifting

See also
Great Britain at the Olympics
Great Britain at the 2000 Summer Paralympics

Notes

Wallechinsky, David (2004). The Complete Book of the Summer Olympics (Athens 2004 Edition). Toronto, Canada. .
International Olympic Committee (2001). The Results. Retrieved 12 November 2005.
Sydney Organising Committee for the Olympic Games (2001). Official Report of the XXVII Olympiad Volume 1: Preparing for the Games. Retrieved 20 November 2005.
Sydney Organising Committee for the Olympic Games (2001). Official Report of the XXVII Olympiad Volume 2: Celebrating the Games. Retrieved 20 November 2005.
Sydney Organising Committee for the Olympic Games (2001). The Results. Retrieved 20 November 2005.
International Olympic Committee Web Site
Gymnastics Results

References

Nations at the 2000 Summer Olympics
2000
Summer Olympics